Harry Landers (born Harry Sorokin; September 3, 1921 – September 10, 2017) was an American character actor. He was born in New York City.

Early life and career
Landers's education came at Public School No. 202 and Thomas Jefferson High School in Brooklyn.

During World War II, Landers served in the United States Merchant Marine.

In the mid-1940s, he began his career as a worker at the Warner Bros. studio in California. An encounter with actress Bette Davis led to a membership of Screen Actors Guild and an acting career. He started out as an extra and was largely uncredited. He studied at the Actors' Laboratory Theatre, known for its left-wing political affiliation.

On Broadway, Landers appeared in A Flag is Born (1948) and Billy Budd. He gained additional theatrical experience in summer stock theatre.

Landers is known for being the spokesman for Taster's Choice coffee in television commercials that aired in the 1970s. He played "Go Go" in the 1953 classic, The Wild One. He had a regular role as Dr. Ted Hoffman on the television series Ben Casey and co-starred in the TV movie The Return of Ben Casey (1988). He had a small role in the Alfred Hitchcock film Rear Window (1954). He played multiple roles in Cecil B. DeMille's epic The Ten Commandments (1956). In 1957, Landers played murder victim Donald Briggs in the Perry Mason episode The Case of the Drowning Duck. He also appeared in 1966 on Combat! in the 5th-season episode, "The Losers" and later in a supporting role as the incompent but murderous Dr. Arthur Coleman in the final episode of the original Star Trek television series, "Turnabout Intruder", first screened in 1969.

Death
Landers died September 10, 2017, aged 96.

Filmography

Film

References

External links

 Harry Landers at the American Film Institute
Interview with Harry Landers Classic TV History Blog, April 30, 2010

1921 births
2017 deaths
Male actors from New York City
American male film actors
American male television actors
20th-century American male actors
United States Merchant Mariners of World War II
Jewish American male actors
21st-century American Jews